Ditrogoptera is a monotypic moth genus of the family Noctuidae. Its only species, Ditrogoptera trilineata, is found on Saint Vincent in the Caribbean. Both the genus and species were first described by George Hampson in 1898.

References

Acontiinae
Monotypic moth genera